Lewis Adolphus Bernays  (3 May 1831 – 22 August 1908) was a public servant and agricultural writer in Queensland, Australia.

Early life
Bernays was the son of Dr Adolphus Bernays (a brother of Chakam Isaac Bernays), a professor of German language and literature at King's College London, and his wife Martha, née Arrowsmith, and was born in London. He was educated at King's College, and at the age of nineteen, emigrated to New Zealand, where he engaged in sheep farming for two years.

Australia
Bernays went to Sydney in 1852 obtained a position on the staff of the parliament of New South Wales. In 1859 Sir George Bowen, the governor of Queensland had requested a clerk for the new Legislative Assembly of Queensland. Bernays was appointed and came to Brisbane in 1860, and was present at the opening of the first parliament. He organized the inner working of parliament, became an authority on procedure, and was the guide and friend of successive generations of members of parliament, until his death at Brisbane on 22 August 1908.

Bernays had other activities and was for a time secretary to the Brisbane Board of Water Works and later a member of the board. He was one of the founders of the Queensland Acclimatisation Society, and for a time its president. He was interested in economic botany, published The Olive and its Products (1872), and Cultural Industries for Queensland; Papers on the Cultivation of Useful Plants Suited to the Climate of Queensland (1883). In 1851 he married Mary Anne Eliza, daughter of William Borton.

Created a C.M.G. in 1892, Bernays was a very competent public servant, who played a prominent part in the Queensland parliament. He knew thoroughly its law and practice, and in times of difficulties party leaders naturally turned to him. He was a man of culture and remained a student all his life. One of his sons, Charles Arrowsmith Bernays, born in 1862, was the author of Queensland Politics During Sixty Years, and of Queensland—Our Seventh Political Decade.

Later life
Bernays died of heart failure on 22 August 1908 following a short illness and was survived by five sons and four daughters. Bernays is buried in Toowong Cemetery.

Legacy

In 1909, a bust of Bernays was commissioned from sculptor James Laurence Watts for the Queensland Parliament House.

References

Clem Lack, 'Bernays, Lewis Adolphus (1831–1908)', Australian Dictionary of Biography, Volume 3, Melbourne University Press, 1969, p. 149.

External links
 

1831 births
1908 deaths
Australian Companions of the Order of St Michael and St George
Australian non-fiction writers
Burials at Toowong Cemetery
19th-century Australian public servants